The 2009 Tercera División play-offs to Segunda División B from Tercera División (Promotion play-offs) were the final playoffs for the promotion from 2008–09 Tercera División to 2009–10 Segunda División B. The first four teams in each group (excluding reserve teams) took part in the play-off.

New Format
To start with, the eighteen group winners had the opportunity to be promoted directly to Segunda División B. The eighteen group winners were drawn into a two-legged series where the nine winners promoted to Segunda División B. The nine losing clubs entered the play-off round for the last nine promotion spots.

The eighteen runners-up were drawn against one of the seventeen fourth-placed clubs outside their group and the eighteen third-placed clubs were drawn against one another in a two-legged series. The twenty-seven winners advanced with the nine losing clubs from the champions' series to determine the eighteen teams that entered the last two-legged series for the last nine promotion spots. In all the playoff series, the lower-ranked club played at home first. Whenever there was a tie in position (e.g. like the group winners in the champions' series or the third-placed teams in the first round), a draw determined the club to play at home first.

Teams for 2008–09 play-offs

All groups as 38 of 38 rounds.
The teams highlighted in yellow played the play-offs to Segunda División B.
The teams highlighted in red were relegated to Divisiones Regionales.

Eliminatories
The regular season ended on the 17 May 2009.
The play-offs began on the 23 May and ended on the 28 June 2009.

1st eliminatory
For 1st of group only.

Promoted to Segunda División B:Gimn. de Torrelavega, Unión Estepona, Villajoyosa, Varea, Espanyol B, Real Oviedo, Toledo, Palencia and Compostela
Losers:Lagun Onak, Caravaca, Alcalá, Cerro Reyes, Tenerife B, Mallorca B, San Roque, Izarra and Atl. Monzón, continue in the 3rd eliminatory

2nd eliminatory
For 2nd, 3rd and 4th of group only. 2nds played against 4ths and 3rds played against each other.

3rd eliminatory
Winners of 2nd eliminatory (27 teams) and losers of 1st eliminatory (9 teams).

4th eliminatory
Winners of 3rd eliminatory.

Promoted to Segunda División B:Izarra, San Roque, Alcalá, Cerro Reyes, Sporting Mahonés, Cacereño, Caravaca, Mallorca B and Mirandés

External links
Futbolme.com

2008-09
play
2009 Spanish football leagues play-offs